Theopompus is the name of:
 Theopompus, 4th century BC Greek historian
 Theopompus (king of Sparta), 7th–8th century BC Spartan king
 Theopompus (comic poet), 5th century BC comic poet